Marcus M. Marsh (born July 25, 1949) is an American politician who served in the Minnesota House of Representatives from district 17A from 1981 to 1993.

References

1949 births
Living people
Republican Party members of the Minnesota House of Representatives